Elected is the first EP by progressive metal project Ayreon, owned by Dutch musician Arjen Anthony Lucassen. It was released on 25 April 2008 in Germany, Austria and Switzerland, and on 28 April in the rest of Europe. It features the guest performance of German singer Tobias Sammet, from Avantasia and Edguy.

The EP contains an Alice Cooper cover, an acoustic guitar and voice version of "E=MC²" and the track "Ride the Comet", both from the album 01011001. There is also a piano version of The Human Equation's "Day Six: Childhood". Some reviewers and also the CD-Text information on the CD itself call the EP The Universal Ayreonaut.

The album entered at #69 at the France Singles Top 100 and stayed in that position for three weeks.

Background
In January 2008, both Ayreon’s and Avantasia’s latest albums were released (01011001 and The Scarecrow, respectively). The press soon started to create speculations on the possibility of them being rivals and which album would be more successful. When asked about this, Arjen Anthony Lucassen (mastermind behind Ayreon) stated that he was mad at Tobias Sammet, head of Avantasia, because Tobias managed to have Alice Cooper, who is Arjen's favorite singer, to perform on his last Avantasia album, leading to some incendiary emails sent to Sammet on Lucassen's part. Coincidentally, Tobias was also mad at Arjen because he had Bruce Dickinson (Tobias' favorite singer) performing on his Ayreon album Universal Migrator Part 2: Flight of the Migrator and the media's constant queries about his thoughts on Ayreon after the creation of his Avantasia project. To "put some fuel on the fire created by the press", as Arjen stated on his website, they decided to record a song together. Initially, the EP was to be titled Ayreon vs. Avantasia.

Track listing
"Elected" (Alice Cooper cover) - 3:37
"E=MC²" (Live acoustic radio version) - 3:32
"Ride the Comet" - 3:32
"Day Six: Childhood" (Piano version) - 3:04

Personnel
Arjen Anthony Lucassen (Ayreon) – electric and acoustic guitars, bass, keyboards
Ed Warby (Gorefest) – drums
Tobias Sammet (Edguy, Avantasia) – lead vocals in "Elected"
Marjan Welman (Elister, Autumn) – lead vocals in "E=MC²" and "Day Six: Childhood"
Floor Jansen (After Forever) – vocals in "Ride the Comet"
Tom Englund (Evergrey) – vocals in "Ride the Comet"
Jonas Renkse (Katatonia) – vocals in "Ride the Comet"
Bob Catley (Magnum) – vocals in "Ride the Comet"
Magali Luyten (Virus IV) – vocals in "Ride the Comet"
Joost van den Broek (After Forever) – piano in "Day Six: Childhood"

References

External links
 Ayreon official website

Ayreon albums
2008 EPs
Inside Out Music EPs